The 1969 Wildwater Canoeing World Championships was the 6th edition of the global wildwater canoeing competition, Wildwater Canoeing World Championships, organised by the International Canoe Federation.

Results

K1 classic

Men individual

Women individual

Men team

Women team

C1 classic

Men individual

Men team

C2 classic

Men individual

Men team

Mixen individual

Mixed team

See also
 Wildwater canoeing

References

External links
 

Wildwater Canoeing World Championships